The 2021–22 Tennessee Tech Golden Eagles men's basketball team represented Tennessee Technological University in the 2021–22 NCAA Division I men's basketball season. The Golden Eagles, led by third-year head coach John Pelphrey, played their home games at the Eblen Center in Cookeville, Tennessee as members of the Ohio Valley Conference.

Previous season
The Golden Eagles finished the 2020–21 season 5–22, 5–15 in OVC play to finish in eleventh place. Since only the top 8 teams qualify for the OVC tournament, they failed to qualify.

Roster

Schedule and results

|-
!colspan=12 style=| Exhibition

|-
!colspan=12 style=| Non-conference regular season

|-
!colspan=12 style=| OVC regular season

|-
!colspan=9 style=|Ohio Valley tournament

Sources

References

Tennessee Tech Golden Eagles men's basketball seasons
Tennessee Tech Golden Eagles
Tennessee Tech Golden Eagles men's basketball
Tennessee Tech Golden Eagles men's basketball